Mary Pickford (1892–1979) was a Canadian motion picture actress, producer, and writer. During the silent film era she became one of the first great celebrities of the cinema and a popular icon known to the public as "America's Sweetheart".

Pickford was born Gladys Marie Smith in Toronto and began acting on stage in 1900. She started her film career in the United States in 1909. Initially with the Biograph film company, she moved to the Independent Motion Picture Company (IMP) in 1911, then briefly to the Majestic Film Company later that same year, followed by a return to Biograph in 1912. After appearing in over 150 short films during her years with these studios she began working in features with Adolph Zukor's Famous Players Film Company, a studio which eventually became part of Paramount Pictures. By 1916 Pickford's popularity had climbed to the point that she was awarded a contract that made her a partner with Zukor and allowed her to produce her films. In 1919 Pickford teamed with D.W. Griffith, Charlie Chaplin, and Douglas Fairbanks to create United Artists, an organization designed to distribute their films. She married Fairbanks in 1920.  Following the release of Secrets (1933), Pickford retired from acting in motion pictures, but remained active as a producer for several years afterward. She sold her stock in United Artists in 1956.

The timeline offered here presents significant events in Mary Pickford's life and juxtaposes them against notable events in the history and development of cinema.  More emphasis is placed on the silent era, when she was most active, with particular attention to her three United Artists partners.  Also presented are notable events that occurred in the United States.

Timeline

Before 1891

1891–1900

1901–1910

1911–1915

1916–1920

1921–1925

1926–1930

1931–1940

1941–1950

1951–1979

1980–present

References

Notes

Footnotes

Bibliography
Website
 
Books
 
 
  (Originally titled Mary Pickford – America's Sweetheart)
 
 
 

 
 

Mary Pickford